The following is a list of paintings by Suze Robertson that are generally accepted as autograph by the RKD and other sources.

References

Sources

 ''Suze Robertson in the RKD

Suze Robertson
Robertson